This is the discography for Dutch electronic musician Laidback Luke.

Studio albums

Extended plays

Compilation albums

Mix albums

Singles

As lead artist

Remixes 

 1996
 Green Velvet – The Stalker (LBL Remix)

 1998
 Lambda – Hold on Tight (LBL Remix)
 DJ Hyperactive – Wide Open (LBL Remix)

 2000
 Jark Prongo - Rocket Base (LBL Remix)

 2003
 Daft Punk – Crescendolls (LBL Remix)
 Patrick Alavi – To Be (LBL Remix)

 2004
 Steve Angello – Voices (LBL Remix)

 2005
 MYPD – You're Not Alone (LBL Remix)

 2006
 Hardrox – Feel the Hard Rock (LBL Remix)
 Another Chance – The Sound of Eden (LBL Remix)

 2007
 TV Rock and Dukes of Windsor – The Others (LBL Remix)
 DJ DLG and Laidback Luke – Ambition (LBL Remix)
 David Guetta featuring Cozi – Baby When the Light (LBL Remix)
 Denis Naidanow – Ascension (LBL Remix)

 2008
 Natalie Williams – U Don't Know (LBL Remix)
 Roger Sanchez – Again (LBL Remix)
 Paul Johnson – Get Get Down (LBL Remix)
 Juice String – Sex Weed (LBL Remix)
 David Guetta featuring Tara McDonald – Delirious (LBL Remix)
 TV Rock featuring Rudy – Been a Long Time (LBL Remix)
 Steve Angello – Gypsy (LBL Remix)
 The Black Ghosts – Repetition Kills You (LBL Remix)
 Martin Solveig – I Want You (LBL Remix)
 Roger Sanchez featuring Terri B – Bang That Box (LBL Remix)
 Joachim Garraud – Are U Ready (LBL Remix)
 Chromeo – Fancy Footwork (LBL Remix)
 Tocadisco – Streetgirls (LBL Remix)
 Surkin – White Knight Two (LBL Remix)
 Daft Punk – Teachers (LBL Rework)
 Dada Life – Rubber Band Boogie (LBL Remix)
 Ray Parker Jr. – Ghostbusters Theme (LBL Remix)
Michael Jackson - Thriller (Laidback Luke Remix)
Daft Punk - Teachers (Laidback Luke's 2008 Rework)

 2009
 David Guetta featuring Kelly Rowland – When Love Takes Over (LBL Remix)
 Tiësto – I Will Be Here (LBL Remix)
 Mstrkrft featuring John Legend – Heartbreaker (LBL Remix)
 Junior Sanchez featuring Good Charlotte – Elevator (LBL Remix)
 Avicii – Ryu (LBL Edit)
 The Black Eyed Peas – I Gotta Feeling (LBL Remix)
 Dizzee Rascal featuring Chrome – Holiday (LBL Remix)
 Martin Solveig featuring Dragonette – Boys & Girls (LBL Remix)
 Sandro Silva – Prom Night (LBL Remix)
 Depeche Mode – Fragile Tension (LBL Remix)
 Robbie Rivera – Rock the Disco (LBL Edit)
 Calvin Harris – You Used to Hold Me (LBL Remix)
 Korgis – Need Your Lovin' (Laidback Luke Remix)

 2010
 Tiësto - Flight 643 (Laidback Luke 2010 Rework)
 Wynter Gordon – Dirty Talk (Laidback Luke Remix)
 Moby – Wait For Me (Laidback Luke Remix)
 Christina Aguilera – Not Myself Tonight (Laidback Luke Remix)
 Carte Blanche featuring Kid Sister – Do! Do! Do! (Laidback Luke Remix)
 Bad Boy Bill featuring Eric Jag – Got That Feeling (Laidback Luke Remix)
 Lil Jon featuring Kee – Give It All You Got (Laidback Luke Remix)
 iSquare – Hey Sexy Lady (Laidback Luke Remix)
 Kissy Sell Out - Garden Friends (Laidback Luke Remix)

 2011
 Benny Benassi featuring Gary Go – Cinema (Laidback Luke Remix)
 Alice Deejay – Better Off Alone (Laidback Luke Remix)
 Jump Jump Dance Dance – 2.0 (Laidback Luke Remix)
 Laura LaRue – Un, Deux, Trois (Laidback Luke Remix)
 Chris Lake - Sundown (Laidback Luke Remix)
 Skream featuring Sam Frank – Where You Should Be (Laidback Luke Remix)
 Anjulie – Brand New Bitch (Laidback Luke Remix)
 GTA featuring Zashanell – U & I (Laidback Luke Remix)
 Chris Brown featuring Benny Benassi – Beautiful People (Laidback Luke Edit)
 Patric La Funk – Time And Time Again (Laidback Luke Edit)
 Pitbull featuring Marc Anthony – Rain Over Me (Laidback Luke Remix)
 David Guetta featuring Nicki Minaj – Turn Me On (David Guetta and Laidback Luke Remix)

 2012
 Aaron Smith featuring Luvli – Dancin' (Laidback Luke Remix)
 Madonna featuring Nicki Minaj and M.I.A. – Give Me All Your Luvin’ (Laidback Luke Remix)
 Felix Cartal featuring Polina – Don't Turn On the Lights (Laidback Luke Remix)
 Rita Ora - How We Do (Laidback Luke Remix)
 Congorock - Ivory (Laidback Luke Edit)
 Mariah Carey - Triumphant (Laidback Luke Dub)
 Sato Goldschlag featuring Wynter Gordon - Hey Mr. Mister (Laidback Luke Remix)
 Dragonette - Let It Go (Laidback Luke Remix)
 Sub Focus featuring Alice Gold - Out The Blue (Laidback Luke Remix)
 Tiësto and Mark Knight featuring Dino - Beautiful World (Laidback Luke Remix)
 Kerli - Zero Gravity (Laidback Luke Remix)
 Savoy and Heather Bright - We Are The Sun (Laidback Luke Remix)
 Martel - Ricochet (Laidback Luke Remix)
 Karmin - Hello (Laidback Luke Remix)
 Chuckie and Junxterjack - Make Some Noise (Laidback Luke Remix)
 Austin Leeds featuring Jason Caesar - Close Your Eyes (Laidback Luke Remix)
 Yolanda Be Cool featuring Arama Mara - Before Midnight (Laidback Luke Remix)

 2013
 Wallpaper. - Good 4 It (Laidback Luke Goes Melbourne Remix)
 Robin Thicke featuring T.I. and Pharrell - Blurred Lines (Laidback Luke Remix)
 Donna Summer - MacArthur Park (Laidback Luke Remix)
 Calvin Harris featuring Ayah Marar - Thinking About You (Laidback Luke Remix)

 2014
 Alex Metric - Heart Weighs A Ton featuring Stefan Storm (Laidback Luke 'Jack' Remix)

 2015
 Kryoman - Loaded (Laidback Luke Remix)
 Jack Eye Jones - Story (Laidback Luke Remix)

2016
 Timmy Trumpet - Mantra (Laidback Luke Edit)
 Max Vangeli and De Kibo - Feel The Music (Laidback Luke Remix)

2018
 Kura - Lambo (Laidback Luke Remix)
 Tiësto and Dzeko featuring Preme and Post Malone - Jackie Chan (Laidback Luke Remix)
 Afrojack featuring Mightyfools - Keep It Low (Laidback Luke Remix)
 Armin van Buuren featuring  Conrad Sewell - Sex, Love & Water (Laidback Luke Remix)

2019
 De Jeugd van Tegenwoordig - Let The Tits Out (Laidback Luke Remix)
 Calvin Harris and Rag'n'Bone Man - Giant (Laidback Luke Remix)
 Avicii - SOS (Laidback Luke Tribute Remix)
 Afrojack and Jewelz & Sparks featuring Emmalyn - Switch (Laidback Luke Remix)
 Deorro, Henry Fong and Elvis Crespo - Pica (Laidback Luke Remix)
 Knife Party featuring Harrison - Death & Desire (Laidback Luke Remix)

2021
 Illenium and Nurko featuring Valerie Broussard - Sideways (Laidback Luke Remix)
 Laidback Luke and Rak-Su - Over & Over (VIP Mix)

References 

Discographies of Dutch artists
Electronic music discographies